Chauncey Thomas Kirby (October 15, 1871 – October 23, 1950) was a Canadian ice hockey player in the 1890s for the Ottawa Hockey Club of the Ontario Hockey Association and Amateur Hockey Association of Canada (AHAC). He was a member of the three-time Ottawa champions from 1891 to 1893. He played in the original Stanley Cup playoff Final in 1894, and scored the contest's first goal (which ended up being the club's lone goal in what was a 2-1 defeat to the Montreal team). His brother Halder also played for the club. He was part of two Stanley Cups with the Ottawa club in 1903 and 1904 as a Director.

Personal life
Kirby was born in Ottawa in 1871, the second-youngest of seven children born to Thomas Halder and Mary Kirby (née Graham), British/Irish immigrants to Canada. There were four boys, Chauncey, Halder, Richmond and Lincoln (died in infancy) and three girls, Elizabeth, Emma and Laura. Thomas is listed in the 1872 census as a bank manager, and in the 1881 census as a city foreman.

Career
Chauncey Kirby joined the Ottawa HC in 1890 and played six seasons for the club, and was elected captain for the 1895–96 season. He played again for the club in 1898-99 before retiring. He became a referee after retiring. He would be the referee of record for the 1908 Stanley Cup challenge between the Winnipeg Maple Leafs and the Montreal Wanderers.

See also
 1903 CAHL season
 1904 CAHL season

References

Ottawa Senators (original) players
Ice hockey people from Ottawa
1872 births
1950 deaths
Canadian ice hockey forwards